Glen Leon Dallin Jr. (March 26, 1918 Silver City, Utah – December 31, 1993) was an American music theorist whose primary work was Techniques of Twentieth Century Composition: A Guide to the Materials of Modern Music.

Dallin was born in Utah. He received his bachelor's and master's degrees in music from Eastman School of Music and a Ph.D. from The University of California, Berkeley.  He then was a professor at Brigham Young University from 1948-1955 and at California State University, Long Beach from 1955 to 1983.

References

Sources
Leon Dallin Collection at Sibley Music Library, Eastman School of Music

1918 births
1993 deaths
Eastman School of Music alumni
University of California, Berkeley alumni
Brigham Young University faculty
California State University, Long Beach faculty
American music theorists
People from Juab County, Utah
20th-century American musicologists